Rapide Club de Relizane , known as RC Relizane or simply RCR for short, is a football club based in the city of Relizane. The club was founded in 1934 and its colours are white and green. Their home stadium, Stade Tahar Zoughari, has a capacity of some 30,000 spectators. The club is currently playing in the Algerian Ligue 2.

History
The club came third in the 1988/1989 season in the Algerian first division.

The club came seventh in the 2009–10 Ligue Inter-Régions de football – Groupe Ouest.

The club was promoted for the 2010–11 season of the newly created Championnat National de Football Amateur due to the professionalisation of the first two divisions in Algeria.

In 2015, The club returned to the Ligue Professionnelle 1 after 25 years of absence.

Honours

Domestic competitions
 Algerian Ligue Professionnelle 2
Champion (1): 1984–85

Performance in CAF competitions
African Cup Winners' Cup
1990 – First round

Players

Current squad

Personnel

Current technical staff

References

External links 

 
Football clubs in Algeria
RC Relizane
Association football clubs established in 1934
1934 establishments in Algeria
Sports clubs in Algeria